The Constitutional Court of the State of Berlin (abbreviated ) is the state constitutional court of Berlin. It has its seat at the Kammergericht building in the Schöneberg district of Berlin. Since November 2019,  is the president of the court.

Jurisdiction 
The court is mainly responsible for deciding the following types of claims:

Verfassungsbeschwerden (Article 84(2) No 5 ). In 2015, almost 96 percent of all petitions received by the court were constitutional complaints.
 proceedings (Article 84(2) No 1 )
Abstract judicial review of statutes (Article 84(2) No 4 )
Specific judicial review of statutes (Article 84(2) No 2 )
Electoral complaints (Section 14(2) No 1 and 2 )
Complaints concerning popular initiatives, petitions for referendums and referendums (Section 41 of the )

History

Institutional history 
The  of 1 September 1950 contained in its Article 72 a mandate to establish a state constitutional court for Berlin. However, due to the special political and legal position of Berlin before the German reunification, such a court was not established and the mandate for the constitution of the court was abolished in 1974. Therefore, no state constitutional court existed in Berlin until 1992.

To rectify this situation, the Abgeordnetenhaus of Berlin passed a law on the establishment of a Berlin constitutional court in 1990, which entered into force on 2 December 1990. But even before the first election of judges for the newly established court, scheduled for 21 February 1991, the law had to be amended. The main reason for this were the rules on the compensation of the court's judges which were deemed to be unreasonably generous.

From 2007 to 2012, a woman headed the court for the first time – .

Major decisions 
The decision of 12 January 1993 (VerfGH 55/92), that the prosecution of Erich Honecker, the former Chairman of the State Council of East Germany, was incompatible with human dignity as enshrined in Article 1 of the Basic Law for the Federal Republic of Germany due to his state of health, caused considerable controversy.

On 16 November 2022 (VerfGH 154/21), the court declared the 2021 Berlin state election void and ordered a repeat election within 90 days due to "serious systematic deficiencies in the preparation" of the 2021 election. The repeat election will happen on the last possible Sunday within this 90 days-period, thus on 12 February 2023. The annulment of the election was the first court-ordered voidance of a German state election since the 1991 Hamburg state election.

Composition and judges

Composition and election 
The Constitutional Court of the State of Berlin is composed of nine judges including its president and vice-president (Article 84(1) ). Three of the nine judges must be professional judges and three others must be qualified to hold judicial office. All judges are elected by the Abgeordnetenhaus of Berlin with a two-thirds majority (Article 84(1) ) for a seven-year term without the possibility of re-election.

Only persons who have reached the age of 35 and are eligible for election to the Bundestag may serve as judges of the court. Men and women must each make up at least three of the Constitutional Court judges. All judges serve in an honorary capacity and only receive a small reimbursement.

Presidents

Vice-Presidents

Notes

References

Bibliography

Further reading

External links 

Gesetz über den Verfassungsgerichtshof (VerfGHG) of 8 November 1990
Geschäftsordnung des Verfassungsgerichtshofes des Landes Berlin of 22 January 2016

Politics of Berlin
Constitutional courts
Courts in Germany
Courts and tribunals established in 1992
Organisations based in Berlin